Falling in Love Again is a solo album by David Gates of Bread.

Critical reception
The album received mixed to fair reviews.  Orange Coast wrote that "there is a general lack of variety here, although Gates does attempt to mix ballads with a few uptempo numbers."

Track listing 
All tracks composed and arranged by David Gates
"Can I Call You" - (3:44)
"Where Does the Lovin' Go" - (3:04)
"20th Century Man" - (2:41)
"She Was So Young" - (2:40)
"Silky" - (2:37)
"Falling in Love Again" - (2:18)
"Starship Ride" - (2:50)
"Chingo" - (3:05)
"Sweet Desire" - (2:58)
"Rainbow Song" - (3:33)

Personnel
David Gates - guitar, vocals
Dan Dugmore - steel guitar
David Minor - bass
Hadley Hockensmith - guitar
Jim Horn - saxophone
Larry Knechtel - keyboards
Mike Botts - drums
Robin Williamson - guitar

References

1979 albums
David Gates albums
Elektra Records albums